Cross Keys Airport  is a privately-owned, public use airport located one nautical mile (2 km) south of the Cross Keys area of Monroe Township in Gloucester County, New Jersey. A skydiving operation is based at the airport.

History 
On May 25, 2006, several F-16 jets escorted a Cessna aircraft to land at Cross Keys Airport after it strayed into a 30-mile restricted area temporarily imposed during the visit of U.S. President George W. Bush to a town in Pennsylvania. The pilot was said to be "in radio contact... compliant."

Facilities and aircraft 
Cross Keys Airport covers an area of 280 acres (113 ha) at an elevation of 162 feet (49 m) above mean sea level. It has one runway designated 9/27 with an asphalt surface measuring 3,500 by 50 feet (1,067 x 15 m).

For the 12-month period ending December 31, 2010, the airport had 25,620 general aviation aircraft operations, an average of 70 per day. At that time there were 41 aircraft based at this airport: 90% single-engine and 10% multi-engine.

Accidents
There have been 13 non-fatal and two fatal accidents at Cross Keys Airport. The two fatal accidents have been:

On March, 13, 1986, a 38=year-old man was fatally injured when he attempted to land at night in low visibility and fog. He impacted two houses and was killed.
On June 13, 1996, a student pilot, his Flight instructor, and a passenger were killed while performing emergency engine-out maneuvers. Mama Juana was found in the student pilot's system. The plane did not have duel controls, making the student the only person able to control the plane, and the plane was not approved for student training because of its controls system.

See also 
 List of airports in New Jersey

References

External links 
 Cross Keys Airport (17N) from New Jersey DOT Airport Directory
 Aerial image as of March 1995 from USGS The National Map
 Aviation photos of Cross Keys Airport at jetphotos.net
 Skydive Cross Keys
 

Airports in New Jersey
Monroe Township, Gloucester County, New Jersey
Transportation buildings and structures in Gloucester County, New Jersey